Nelson Azeem  is a Pakistani politician who had been a member of the National Assembly of Pakistan from 2008 to 2013.

Political career
He was elected to the National Assembly of Pakistan on a seat reserved for minorities as a candidate of Pakistan Muslim League (N) in the 2008 Pakistani general election.

Family
He is married Phyllis Azeem.

References

Living people
Pakistani MNAs 2008–2013
Year of birth missing (living people)